Adam Elliott (born 16 October 1994) is an Australian professional rugby league footballer who plays as a  and  forward for the Newcastle Knights in the NRL.

He previously played for the Canterbury-Bankstown Bulldogs and Canberra Raiders in the National Rugby League.

He has played for Country NSW and the Indigenous All Stars sides.

Background
Elliott was born in Bega, New South Wales, Australia and is of Indigenous Australian and Latvian descent.

He played his junior rugby league for the Tathra Sea Eagles. He attended St Gregory's College, Campbelltown and played in the college's GIO Schoolboys Cup side, before being signed by the Canterbury-Bankstown Bulldogs.

Playing career

Early career
In 2013 and 2014, Elliott played for the Canterbury-Bankstown Bulldogs' NYC team, before graduating to their New South Wales Cup team in 2015. 

On 3 May 2015, he played for the New South Wales Residents against the Queensland Residents. On 27 September 2015, he was named at second-row in the 2015 New South Wales Cup Team of the Year. On 3 November 2015, he re-signed with Canterbury on a two-year contract.

2016
In round 1 of the 2016 NRL season, Elliott made his NRL debut for Canterbury-Bankstown against the Manly-Warringah Sea Eagles.

2018
Elliott made 24 appearances for Canterbury in the 2018 season scoring 4 tries.   In September 2018, Canterbury held Mad Monday celebrations at The Harbour View Hotel in Sydney's CBD. Later in the evening, photographs provided by the media showed Canterbury players being heavily intoxicated, stripping naked and vomiting in the street. Elliott was handed a $25,000 fine (including $10,000 suspended) by Canterbury after nude images of the player appeared in the media. Elliott was also handed a notice to attend court for wilful and obscene exposure.

On 17 December, Elliott was handed a two-year good behaviour bond with no conviction recorded at Sydney's Downing Centre Local Court for his role in the Mad Monday celebrations.

2019
Elliott made 20 appearances for Canterbury-Bankstown in the 2019 NRL season as the club struggled towards the bottom of the table.  At one point the club was sitting last on the table and was in danger of getting the wooden spoon.  For the third straight season however Canterbury achieved four upset victories in a row over Penrith, the Wests Tigers, South Sydney and Parramatta who were all competing for a place in the finals series and were higher on the table.  Canterbury ended the season finishing 12th on the table.

2020
In round 8 of the 2020 NRL season, Elliott was taken from the field during Canterbury's 26–10 loss against Souths at Bankwest Stadium.  It was later revealed that Elliott had dislocated his shoulder and would be ruled out for the season.

2021
On 15 February 2021, Elliott was involved in an incident with former NRL player Michael Lichaa and Lichaa's fiancée.  The matter was referred on to the NRL integrity unit where Elliott avoided suspension and a fine. Elliott pledged to Canterbury that he would seek professional help in regards to his problems with alcohol.

On 23 August, Elliott was stood down by Canterbury for the remaining two matches of the season after he was allegedly ejected from a Gold Coast restaurant for poor behaviour.
On 26 August, Elliott was fined $10,000 by the NRL for bringing the game into disrepute.  There was also further allegations involving Elliott, which included that he had taken women's rugby league player Millie Boyle into the men's toilet at the Gold Coast restaurant where they kissed and he removed his shirt.  It was after this moment that the restaurant workers asked Elliott to leave the premises.

On 10 September, Elliott and Canterbury came to a mutual agreement to end his playing contract with the club.

In late October 2021, Canberra Raiders signed Elliott to a 12-month contract, to resume his playing career in the 2022 NRL season.

2022
In June, Elliott signed a three-year contract with the Newcastle Knights starting in 2023.

Sex scandal 
Best friend and former teammate Michael Lichaa caught his fiancée performing oral sex on Elliott, the court heard in 2022. Lichaa was taken to hospital with serious arm injuries after the altercation after punching the window in an alcohol-fuelled rage. The incident, which was initially reported simply as "making out", drew comparisons to Australian rules footballer Wayne Carey, who infamously had sex with the wife of then-teammate and best friend Anthony Stevens in 2002 and was driven away from North Melbourne in disgrace.

"I couldn’t get the image of my fiancee performing oral sex on my best friend out of my mind," Lichaa told the court. Lichaa lost 2.5 litres of blood after punching a window with his hand, with police describing the scene as a "bloodfest". Concerned neighbours, who reported hearing a man scream "I’m going to f***ing kill her", called triple zero.

References

External links

Newcastle Knights profile
Canterbury Bulldogs profile
Canterbury-Bankstown Bulldogs profile
NRL profile

1994 births
Living people
Australian rugby league players
Australian people of Latvian descent
Indigenous Australian rugby league players
Country New South Wales Origin rugby league team players
Canterbury-Bankstown Bulldogs players
Canberra Raiders players
Newcastle Knights players
Rugby league players from Bega, New South Wales
Rugby league second-rows
Wiradjuri people